Cactus High School is  public secondary school located in Glendale, Arizona, United States, part of the Peoria Unified School District. The school opened its doors in August 1977. It is the district's smallest high school, with approximately 1,300 students.

In 1978, the first Cactus High School students, 1980 graduates, transferred from Peoria High School's campus during their sophomore year into the current building.

Notable alumni
 Ryan Carpenter, MLB pitcher for the Detroit Tigers
 Kyle Kosier: Offensive lineman (NFL), free agent
 Brandon McDonald: Midfielder, Real Salt Lake (Major League Soccer)
 Jessica McDonald - professional soccer player. USWNT
 Zach Minter: defensive tackle (NFL), free agent
 Joe Riggs: professional mixed martial artist, WEC Middleweight Champion,; formerly fighting for (Bellator) and Strikeforce; currently competing in the Ultimate Fighting Championship
 Jason Vanacour - professional soccer player
 Rick Soderman - professional soccer player
 Randy Soderman - professional soccer player
 Khris Davis: didn't graduate, transferred to Deer Valley High School in 2004, professional baseball player, Oakland Athletics
 Tyler Schmitt - Professional longer snapper for Seattle Sea hawks

References

External links
 Cactus High School website

Public high schools in Arizona
Education in Glendale, Arizona
Educational institutions established in 1977
Schools in Maricopa County, Arizona
1977 establishments in Arizona